Poecilognathus is a genus of bee flies (insects in the family Bombyliidae). There are at least 20 described species in Poecilognathus.

Species
These 21 species belong to the genus Poecilognathus:

 Poecilognathus alterans (Williston, 1901) c g
 Poecilognathus badia (Coquillett, 1904) i c g
 Poecilognathus bicolor (Coquillett, 1904) i c g
 Poecilognathus fulvida (Coquillett, 1904) c g
 Poecilognathus inornata (Coquillett, 1904) i c g
 Poecilognathus loewi (Painter, 1965) i c g
 Poecilognathus marginata (Coquillett, 1904) i c g
 Poecilognathus philippianus (Rondani, 1863) c g
 Poecilognathus pulchella (Williston, 1901) i
 Poecilognathus punctipennis (Walker, 1849) i c g b
 Poecilognathus radia (Coquillett, 1904) c g
 Poecilognathus relativitae (Evenhuis, 1985) i c g
 Poecilognathus scolopax (Osten Sacken, 1877) i c g
 Poecilognathus stictopennis (Hall, 1976) c g
 Poecilognathus sulphurea (Loew, 1863) i c g
 Poecilognathus testacea (Macquart, 1840) c g
 Poecilognathus thlipsomyzoides Jaennicke, 1867 i c g
 Poecilognathus unicolor (Bezzi, 1925) c g
 Poecilognathus unimaculata (Coquillett, 1904) i c g
 Poecilognathus unimaculatus b
 Poecilognathus xanthogaster (Hall, 1976) c g

Data sources: i = ITIS, c = Catalogue of Life, g = GBIF, b = Bugguide.net

References

Further reading

External links

 
 
 

Bombyliidae genera